Paulinia is a genus of grasshoppers in the monotypic South American subfamily Pauliniinae Hebard, 1923 in the Acrididae, itself a monotypic genus erected by Blanchard in 1843 for the species Paulinia muscosa: now Paulinia acuminata (De Geer, 1773).

References

External links
 

Acrididae genera
Orthoptera of South America